Mihăești is a commune located in Vâlcea County, Oltenia, Romania. It is composed of thirteen villages: Arsanca, Bârsești, Buleta, Govora, Gurișoara, Măgura, Mihăești, Munteni, Negreni, Rugetu, Scărișoara, Stupărei, and Vulpuești.

Notable people
 Nicolae Popa (born 1939), judge

References

Communes in Vâlcea County
Localities in Oltenia